Lockett is an unincorporated community and census-designated place (CDP) in Wilbarger County, Texas, United States. It was first listed as a CDP prior to the 2020 census.

It is in the western part of the county, along U.S. Route 70, which leads northeast  to Vernon, the county seat, and southwest  to Crowell.

Demographics

2020 census

As of the 2020 United States census, there were 173 people, 68 households, and 55 families residing in the CDP.

References 

Census-designated places in Wilbarger County, Texas
Census-designated places in Texas